Future City is an unincorporated community in McCracken County, Kentucky, in the United States.

Future City has been noted for its unusual place name.

References

Unincorporated communities in McCracken County, Kentucky
Unincorporated communities in Kentucky